Józef Sowiński (1777–1831) was a Polish artillery general and one of the heroes of Poland's November 1830 Uprising.

Biography

Józef Longin Sowiński was born on 15 March 1777 in Warsaw. After graduating from the famous Corps of Cadets in Warsaw, he joined the Polish Army as a lieutenant during the Kościuszko Uprising (1794). After its suppression and the dismemberment of Poland by her neighbor states, Sowiński's regiment was drafted into the Prussian army. In 1807 he fought at the Battle of Eylau and received the highest military decoration of Prussia, the Pour le Mérite. However, after the Duchy of Warsaw was proclaimed by Napoleon Bonaparte, Sowiński in 1811 returned into Polish service. 

He fought in various battles of the Napoleonic wars. During Napoleon's invasion of Russia (1812) he lost a leg at the Battle of Borodino, near the village of Mozhaysk. He was awarded the Virtuti Militari and Legion of Honor. After the Congress of Vienna he returned to Poland and served as commander of the Warsaw Arsenal of the Kingdom of Poland Army. In 1820 he became commandant of the Application School for officers.

After the outbreak of the November Uprising against Russia in 1830, Sowiński became artillery commander of the Warsaw garrison and head of the Government Commission of War (de facto Ministry of War). During the Russian assault on Warsaw on 6 September 1831, Sowiński personally commanded the heroic defense of the Polish capital's western approaches, in what is now its Wola district (he had 1,300 men versus 11 Russian battalions).

According to recent historians, just after the surrender negotiations he was bayonetted to death by the Russians (who themselves publicized a story that he had been killed at his post in combat).

His death was immortalized by Polish poets, including Juliusz Słowacki in his Sowiński w okopach Woli (Sowiński in the Wola Trenches). It was also the subject of a painting by Wojciech Kossak and a ballad by Jacek Kaczmarski.

External links

 Sowiński in the trenches of Wola - a poem by Juliusz Słowacki translated by Walter Whipple

1777 births
1831 deaths
Military personnel from Warsaw
Polish commanders of the Napoleonic Wars
Recipients of the Virtuti Militari
Generals of the November Uprising
Prussian Army personnel
Recipients of the Legion of Honour
Recipients of the Order of Saint Stanislaus (Congress Poland)
Polish amputees